BIG4 Holiday Parks, stylised BIG4, is a network of holiday parks that are located throughout Australia. Parks offer various accommodation, including cabins, caravan and camping sites, and even glamping facilities.

BIG4 Holiday Parks is known for being family friendly. Many parks contain facilities that include jumping pillows, splash or water parks, mini-golf facilities and swimming pools.

The Wiggles wrote a song for BIG4 as part of the companies’ major partnership

BIG4's headquarters are in Melbourne, Victoria.

History
The company began in 1979  in the Victorian city of Ballarat where four independent caravan park owners united to form the BIG4 brand. As of 2021, BIG4 has more than 180 holiday parks all over Australia, including in capital and major regional cities.

In 2017, BIG4 implemented a new business model and franchise arrangements.

In 2020, one of BIG4's founders, Desmond Watts, was recognised for his outstanding service to the tourism accommodation sector with a Medal of the Order of Australia (OAM). Mr Watts received this distinction as part of the Queen's Birthday Honour's List in June.

Accommodation types 
BIG4 parks offer a range of accommodation styles including cabins, caravan and RV sites, and camping spots. Some parks have capitalised on the emerging glamping trend, too. The majority of the parks have pet-friendly accommodation  and associated facilities.

See also

 List of hotels
 List of motels

References

External links
 

Hospitality companies of Australia
Transport companies established in 1979
1979 establishments in Australia